The 1913–14 season was the twenty-first season in which Dundee competed at a Scottish national level, playing in Division One, where they would finish in 7th place. Dundee would also compete in the Scottish Cup, where they were knocked out in the 2nd round by St Mirren.

Scottish Division One 

Statistics provided by Dee Archive.

League table

Scottish Cup 

Statistics provided by Dee Archive.

Player Statistics 
Statistics provided by Dee Archive

|}

See also 

 List of Dundee F.C. seasons

References

External links
 1913-14 Dundee season on Fitbastats

Dundee F.C. seasons
Dundee